Bagh-e-Khvas (also Romanized as Bāgh-e Khvāş and Bāgh-e-Kavāş; also known as Bāgh-i-Khās, Bāgh-e Khāş, ‘Alīābād-e Bāgh-e Khvāş, and ‘Alīābād) is a village in Behnamvasat-e Shomali Rural District, in the Central District of Varamin County, Tehran Province, Iran. At the 2006 census, its population was 2,582, in 627 families.

References 

Populated places in Varamin County